The Jordan River Utah Temple (formerly the Jordan River Temple) is the 20th operating temple of the Church of Jesus Christ of Latter-day Saints. Located in South Jordan, Utah, it was built with a modern single-spire design.

A site dedication and groundbreaking ceremony were held on June 9, 1979. The ceremony and dedication were presided over by church president Spencer W. Kimball. Instead of the usual small ceremonial shovel-full of dirt at the groundbreaking, Kimball used a large power scoop shovel to begin the building process. The temple was open to the public for tours September 29 through October 31, 1981. Over half a million people toured the temple during its open house.

On August 7, 2015, the church announced that beginning February 15, 2016, the temple would close for renovations that were anticipated to be completed during the latter part of 2017.  A public open house was held from March 17 through April 28, 2018, excluding Sundays and two Saturdays associated with the church's general conference.  The temple was rededicated by Henry B. Eyring on May 20, 2018.

Dedication

Marion G. Romney, a member of the church's First Presidency, dedicated the Jordan River Temple in fifteen sessions held during November 16–20, 1981. More than 160,000 members attended the dedicatory services. Thirty of those in attendance at the dedication were elderly men and women who had been at the historic dedication of the first temple in the Salt Lake Valley, the Salt Lake Temple. Most had been very young at the time but still remembered the event. The temple serves Latter-day Saints in Southern Salt Lake County, Utah. Geographically, it is the smallest Latter-day Saint temple district in the world, but the temple is one of the church's busiest.

Features

The temple also has the largest capacity, with each ordinance room able to accommodate 125 people. The exterior of the temple is finished with cast stone with white marble chips. Unlike many of the temples, which are built mostly with tithing funds, the Jordan River Temple site was given to the church and all of its construction was paid for by members in the 134 stakes within the temple district. At the time, payment from local building funds was the established practice in the church, but was later abandoned in order to respond to the church's need for temples and church buildings in developing areas of the world.

Presidents
Notable presidents of the temple include H. Burke Peterson (1985–87); William Grant Bangerter (1990–93); LeGrand R. Curtis (1996–99); Ben B. Banks (2002–05); and Robert L. Backman (2005–08).

See also

 The Church of Jesus Christ of Latter-day Saints in Utah
 Comparison of temples of The Church of Jesus Christ of Latter-day Saints
 List of temples of The Church of Jesus Christ of Latter-day Saints
 List of temples of The Church of Jesus Christ of Latter-day Saints by geographic region
 Temple architecture (Latter-day Saints)

References

External links
 
 Jordan River Utah Temple Official site
 Jordan River Utah Temple at ChurchofJesusChristTemples.org

20th-century Latter Day Saint temples
Religious buildings and structures in Salt Lake County, Utah
Religious buildings and structures completed in 1981
Temples (LDS Church) in Utah
1981 establishments in Utah
Buildings and structures in South Jordan, Utah